In baseball statistics, at bats per home run (AB/HR) is a way to measure how frequently a batter hits a home run. It is determined by dividing the number of at bats by the number of home runs hit. Mark McGwire possesses the MLB record for this statistic with a career ratio of 10.61 at bats per home run and Babe Ruth is second, with 11.76 at bats per home run. Aaron Judge has the best career ratio among active players with 11.99 at bats per home run, as of October 5, 2022.

Major League Baseball leaders

Career

Totals are current , minimum 3,000 plate appearances.
Mark McGwire - 10.61
Babe Ruth - 11.76
Aaron Judge - 11.99
Barry Bonds - 12.92
Jim Thome - 13.76

Season
Single-season statistics are current .
Barry Bonds - 6.52
Mark McGwire - 7.27
Josh Gibson - 7.80
Mark McGwire - 8.02
Mark McGwire - 8.13

Babe Ruth was the first batter to average fewer than nine at-bats per home run over a season, hitting his 54 home runs of the 1920 season in 457 at-bats; an average of 8.463. Seventy-eight years later, Mark McGwire became the first batter to average fewer than eight AB/HR, hitting his 70 home runs of the 1998 season in 509 at-bats (an average of 7.2714). In 2001, Barry Bonds became the first batter to average fewer than seven AB/HR, setting the Major League record by hitting his 73 home runs of the 2001 season in 476 at-bats for an average of 6.5205.

Ruth led the American League every year from 1918 until 1931, except for 1925.

Ruth, Josh Gibson, McGwire and Bonds are the only batters in history to average nine or fewer AB/HR over a season, having done so a combined ten times:

Aaron Judge's 62 HR season in 2022 came at a rate of 9.19 AB/HR.

References

Batting statistics